This is a summary of 1941 in music in the United Kingdom.

Events
29 March – Benjamin Britten's Sinfonia da Requiem is premiered in Carnegie Hall by the New York Philharmonic Orchestra conducted by John Barbirolli.
3 April – William Walton's Scapino overture has its premiere in Chicago, conducted by Frederick Stock.
May – Arthur Bliss joins the BBC's overseas music service. 
10 May – London's Queen's Hall, venue for the Promenade Concerts, is bombed by the Luftwaffe.  The Proms re-locate to the Royal Albert Hall.
30 October – On the occasion of Britten's String Quartet No. 1 being performed in Washington, he is awarded the Library of Congress Medal for services to chamber music.

Popular music
"Could You Please Oblige Us with a Bren Gun?" w.m. Noël Coward
 "Down Forget-Me-Not Lane" w.m. Horatio Nicholls, Charlie Chester & Reg Morgan
 "He Wears A Pair Of Silver Wings" w. Eric Maschwitz m. Michael Carr
 "Hey Little Hen" w.m. Ralph Butler & Noel Gay
 "London Pride" w.m. Noël Coward
 "When They Sound The Last All Clear" w.m. Hughie Charles, Louis Elton

Classical music: new works
Kenneth J. Alford
By Land and Sea
Army of the Nile
Richard Addinsell – Warsaw Concerto
Arthur Bliss – String Quartet No. 1
Benjamin Britten – String Quartet No. 1
Ralph Vaughan Williams – England, my England

Opera
Benjamin Britten – Paul Bunyan

Film and Incidental music
Richard Addinsell – Dangerous Moonlight
William Walton – Major Barbara, starring Wendy Hiller and Rex Harrison.

Musical films
He Found a Star, starring Vic Oliver
Turned Out Nice Again, starring George Formby
You Will Remember, starring Robert Morley and Emlyn Williams

Musical theatre
 5 March – Apple Sauce revue opens at the Palladium. 
 24 July – Lady Behave London production opens at His Majesty's Theatre and runs for 401 performances.
 19 November – Get a Load of This London production opens at the Hippodrome Theatre and runs for 698 performances.

Births
12 January – Long John Baldry, R&B singer (died 2005)
4 February – John Steel, drummer (The Animals and Eggs over Easy)
14 February – Big Jim Sullivan, English guitarist (died 2012)
5 April – Dave Swarbrick, folk musician (died 2016)
11 April – Arthur Davies, operatic tenor (died 2018)
13 April – Margaret Price, soprano
23 April – Ed Stewart, disc jockey (died 2016)
3 May – Paul Ferris, film composer and actor (died 1995)
9 May – Pete Birrell, bass player (Freddie and the Dreamers)
11 May – Eric Burdon, R&B singer (The Animals)
21 May – Martin Carthy, folk musician
9 June – Jon Lord, keyboard player and composer (died 2012)
12 June – Reg Presley, singer and songwriter (died 2013)
30 June
 Mike Leander, arranger, songwriter and record producer (died 1996)
 Nigel Walley, tea-chest bass player and golfer
7 July – Jim Rodford, bass player (The Kinks, The Swinging Blue Jeans, The Zombies, The Kast Off Kinks and Argent)
17 July – Spencer Davis, instrumentalist (The Spencer Davis Group)
20 August – Anne Evans, operatic soprano
10 September – Christopher Hogwood, conductor and harpsichordist
27 October – Don Partridge, singer-songwriter (died 2010) 
2 November – Brian Poole, singer (The Tremeloes)
15 November – Rick Kemp, singer-songwriter, bass player and producer (Steeleye Span)
24 November – Pete Best, rock drummer (The Beatles original lineup)
27 December
Les Maguire, pop pianist (Gerry & the Pacemakers)
Mike Pinder, rock keyboard player (The Moody Blues)
29 December – Ray Thomas, rock flautist and singer-songwriter (The Moody Blues) (died 2018)

Deaths
10 January – Frank Bridge, composer, 61
19 February – Sir Hamilton Harty, conductor and composer, 61
11 March – Sir Henry Walford Davies, composer, 71
27 March – Stewart Macpherson, music teacher and writer, 75 
16 August – John Coates, operatic tenor, 76
date unknown – William Hargreaves, music hall composer

See also
 1941 in British television
 1941 in the United Kingdom
 List of British films of 1941

References

 
British music by year
1940s in British music